Buddy Daddies is an original Japanese anime television series animated by P.A. Works and produced by Aniplex and Nitroplus. It is directed by Yoshiyuki Asai and written by Vio Shimokura of Nitroplus and Yūko Kakihara, with Katsutoshi Kitagawa of Round Table composing the music. Katsumi Enami provided the original character designs, and Souichirou Sako is adapting the designs for animation while also serving as chief animation director along with Sanae Satō. It premiered on January 7, 2023, on Tokyo MX and other networks.

Plot
Buddy Daddies centers on a family of three who aren't related to each other: Kazuki Kurusu and Rei Suwa, assassins who live under one roof; and Miri, the daughter of Kazuki and Rei's assassination target who ended up being picked up by Kazuki, who she thinks is her biological father.

Characters

28 years old. Rei's assassin buddy who takes care of him. On duty, he focuses on collecting information in advance, and executing the plan. He has good communication skills, and likes gambling. He is good at cooking and cleaning. He had a wife, Yuzuko, who was pregnant with his child, but lost both of them due to his job.

25 years old. He specialises in combat on missions and tends to go over the top. He lets his hair down during off duty and lives a hikkikomori lifestyle, playing video games all night. He finds it hard to smile, due to his abusive upbringing by his father, another professional assassin. He slowly warms up to Miri and accepts his role as one of her parents alongside Kazuki.

A 4-year-old girl who was sent away by her mother to be in the care of her long lost father when her mother could no longer parent her. It is revealed that her father was Kazuki and Rei's most recent target who they assassinated. Kazuki takes it upon himself to become her guardian with Rei warming up to the role later. She loves teasing and playing with Kazuki and Rei. She affectionately calls Kazuki and Rei her "Papas."

 
 A cafe owner who supplies Rei and Kazuki with both jobs and information.

 Teacher at the Aozora Daycare that Miri attends. 

 
 Kazuki's late wife who was killed by accident during one of his missions five years ago.

 Yuzuko's younger sister and Kazuki's sister-in-law.

 Miri's mother. She is a prostitute works as a singer at a struggling night club run by her abusive boyfriend. She comes to resent Miri and abandons her as a result.

 An assassin and the main antagonist. He is cold-blooded killer who will kill without holding any feelings towards anybody he kills. He is acquainted with Kyutaro and was involved in the incident that led to Yuzuko's death, and has a grudge against Rei for leaving his father's organization.

Episode list
The opening theme song is "Shock!" by Ayase, while the ending theme song is "My Plan" by DURDN. 

Crunchyroll has licensed the series outside of Asia, and will be streaming it along with an English dub.

Production
According to Mitsuhito Tsuji and Toba Yosuke, Buddy Daddies is inspired by some of the anime staff members who have children.

References

External links
 Anime official website 
 

2023 anime television series debuts
Anime with original screenplays
Aniplex
Crunchyroll anime
Espionage in anime and manga
Nitroplus
P.A.Works
Tokyo MX original programming